NBFL may refer to:

 National Bank Financial - acquired by National Bank of Canada
 North Berks Football League
 New Brunswick Federation of Labour
 New Routemaster - London bus initially known as the New Bus for London